Benkovski may refer to:

Places in Bulgaria
Benkovski, Dobrich Province, a village in Dobrichka Municipality
Benkovski, Kardzhali Province, village in Kardzhali Province
Benkovski, Varna Province, a village in the Avren Municipality
Benkovski, Sofia Province, a village
Georgi Benkovski Stadium, a multi-use stadium in Pazardzhik

People
Georgi Benkovski (1843 – 1876), Bulgarian revolutionary

Other
Benkovski Nunatak, a rocky peak of elevation 450 m projecting from the ice cap of Greenwich Island, South Shetland Islands
FC Benkovski Byala, a football club based in Byala, Bulgaria